Muhammad Jailani Abu Talib (born 1985, Singapore) is a poet and writer.

Background

Muhammad Jailani Abu Talib read Malay language and literature in University of Malaya (UM).

In UM, he was President of the Malay Language Society in the university (PBMUM). Past presidents include Dr. Nuwairi Haji Khaza'ai, Dato' Seri Anwar Ibrahim  and Datuk Ahmad Shaberry Cheek. He served as president of the society for two consecutive years from 2009-2011.

Publications
His poems have been published in the poetry anthologies "Reflecting On The Merlion: An Anthology of Poems" and "From The Window of This Epoch". In 2009, he won the Golden Point Award (2nd) for short stories.

Works 
 "Reflecting On The Merlion : An Anthology of Poems", by Edwin Thumboo and Yeow Kai Chai (2009, Singapore : firstfruits publications), 
 "Antologi Puisi Malaysia dan Singapura : Dari Jendela Zaman Ini", by ITNM and NAC (2009, Kuala Lumpur : Institut Terjemahan Negara Malaysia), 
 "Bahasa Sumber Intelektual Peribumi", by Muhammad Jailani Abu Talib & Mohamed Pitchay Gani Bin Mohamed Abdul Aziz (2009, Singapore : Asas 50 Press), 
 "Evolution of Malay Language : 2000 Years", by Muhammad Jailani Abu Talib (Ed.) (2009, Singapore : Asas 50 Press & Malay Heritage Centre), 
 "RESAN : Antologi Cerpen & Sajak", by Muhammad Jailani Abu Talib and Mohamed Pitchay Gani Bin Mohamed Abdul Aziz (2009, Singapore : Asas 50 Press), 
 "Rumpun Kita", by Shamsudin Othman, Rahimidin Zahari, Mohamad Saleeh Rahamad, dan S.M. Zakir (2009, Kuala Lumpur : Persatuan Penulis Nasional Malaysia), 
 "Jejak Para Kaul 1", by Leonowens SP (2010, Jakarta : Bisnis 2030), 
 "Jejak Para Kaul II", by Leonowens SP (2010, Jakarta : Bisnis 2030), 
 "Susur Pendekar : Koleksi Puisi", by Muhammad Jailani Abu Talib (2010, Singapore : Reka Media), 
 "Kampung Warisan Kuala Lumpur : Antologi Puisi 56 Penyair", by Pyanhabib + Dinsman (2010, Kuala Lumpur : Seniman Paksi Rakyat),

Awards
 2008 - Certificate of Distinction for Menggapai Angkasa by Angkatan Sasterawan 50
 2009 - Essay Cheeseman Award by University of Malaya
 2009 - Certificate of Distinction for Antara Tumasik dan Singapura by Angkatan Sasterawan 50
 2009 - Golden Point Award by National Arts Council (Singapore)
 2009 - NAC (Overseas) Bursary Award by National Arts Council (Singapore)
 2009 - Youth Activist Icon (Tokoh Belia Aktivis) by National Institute of Education, Nanyang Technological University
 2010 - Model Young Writer (Tokoh Penulis Muda) by Mutiara Minda, MPH, Malaysia
 2011 - Gold Award (Anugerah Kencana) by Malay Language Society, University of Malaya
 2011 - Alumni Award by University of Malaya

External links 
 SCRIBD.com, Muhammad Jailani Abu Talib Scribd Page

Bibliography

 ITNM & NAC, "Through The Window of This Epoch", Institut Terjemahan Negara Malaysia, Malaysia, 2009.
 Mohamed Pitchay Gani Bin Mohamed Abdul Aziz & Muhammad Jailani Abu Talib, Bahasa Sumber Intelektual Peribumi, Asas 50 Press, Singapore, 2009.

References 

Singaporean people of Malay descent
Singaporean poets
Living people
Singapore Polytechnic alumni
1985 births